KY Entertainment  (Hanja: 金永, Originally Kumyoung) is a Korean company based in Seoul, South Korea. Its main areas of business are manufacturing of computer music player and audio system,  digital music content.

History
Kumyoung was first established as Namkyoung Industry, a manufacturer of video game arcade machine in Busan, South Korea in August 1983. The firm's name was changed to Kumyoung Industry in 1986 and later to Kumyoung Co. Ltd. in 1989 with the inauguration of Kim Sung Young as its CEO. The company focused on the production of karaoke system and has dominated the Korean Noraebang (노래방) industry and the export markets since the early 90s. In 1996, Kumyoung introduced and patented the world's first HDD-based computer music player with real human voice chorus recording by a TV station.

The company headquarters was moved to Seoul in 2002. It ventured into digital music production in 2003 with the establishment of its affiliate, Square-One Music and mobile phone content services in partnership with some Korean telecom companies. Kumyoung has diversified its core business by offering on-line internet noraebang and Video-on-demand services.

Kumyoung group changed its name to KY Entertainment in 2018.

Milestones
1989  Establishment and registration of Keum Young Entertainment Co., Ltd
1991  Released music accompaniment computer software
1994  Established Beijing Office (Concluded Thailand sales agent contract)
1995  Established US Branch Office in 1995 (Consecutive No.1 in Korean market for home karaoke systems)
1996  Launched the first <Vocal Chorus> karaoke system in the world and maintained No.1 ranking in Korea ever since
1999  Designated as a company with excellent technological competitiveness (acquired CE mark)
2003  Established joint venture in China and concluded export contract for HDD & DVD music accompaniment products with Vietnamese company
2005  Launched the first cable TV interactive music service technology in the world (currently in operation with CJ, LG Korean cable broadcasting service)
2007  Established Japan Branch Office; started exports to Japan: Concluded export contract with Japan BMB (started exporting track finders)
2008  Owned 22 domestic trademarks and 30 domestic patents for karaoke
2009  Designated as one of the top 10 million dollar exporters
2010  Released KMS-A100/a50, feel TONG 600
2011  Released KMS-A300
2012  Released KMS-K95 series
2013  Adopted new song update method using smartphones
2014  Released KMS-Q100, Q200 series
2015  Released KMS-Q300N
2016  Acquired Keum Young Group karaoke business
2017  Launched sales and management device for coin-operated karaoke
2018  Changed corporate name to KY Entertainment
2019  Launched the first AI karaoke service in Korea, KT GiGA Genie Premium Keum Young Karaoke Service

Products
 Computer Music Player
 Speaker and Amplifiers
 LED Screen

Affiliates
 Kumyoung Media

References

External links
 Kumyoung Media Inc.
 Official website (Korean)

Audio equipment manufacturers of South Korea
Companies based in Seoul
Companies established in 1983
South Korean brands